Christopher Bourjos (born October 16, 1954) is an American former professional baseball player who played part of one season for the San Francisco Giants of Major League Baseball. He has worked as an Arizona-based scout.

Playing career
Bourjos attended Northern Illinois University, where he played baseball for the Huskies in 1975 and 1976. He was signed as an amateur free agent by the Giants on March 26, 1977, and was called up by the Giants late in the 1980 season after playing four years in the minor leagues.

Bourjos was traded by the Giants with Bob Knepper to the Houston Astros in exchange for Enos Cabell December 8, 1980, and by the Astros with cash to the Baltimore Orioles in exchange for Kiko Garcia April 1, 1981, but didn't play for either the Astros or Orioles. He returned to the minor leagues, his last season being with Portland (PCL) in 1983.

Scouting career
After his retirement as an active player, Bourjos served as a baseball scout with the Toronto Blue Jays from 1984 to 2002. He had a major role in the ballclub's selection of Roy Halladay with the 17th overall pick in the 1995 MLB Draft. He joined the Milwaukee Brewers in a similar capacity on November 7, 2003. He scouted for the Baltimore Orioles in 2010 and 2011, joining the San Diego Padres in 2012.

Personal
He is a nephew of former Cleveland Indians catcher Otto Denning and the father of Peter Bourjos, former MLB outfielder.

References

External links
, or Retrosheet, or Pelota Binaria (Venezuelan Winter League)

1954 births
Living people
Baltimore Orioles scouts
Baseball players from Chicago
Cardenales de Lara players
American expatriate baseball players in Venezuela
Cedar Rapids Giants players
Charlotte O's players
Fresno Giants players
Major League Baseball outfielders
Milwaukee Brewers scouts
Montreal Expos scouts
Northern Illinois Huskies baseball players
Phoenix Giants players
Portland Beavers players
Rochester Red Wings players
San Diego Padres scouts
San Francisco Giants players
Toronto Blue Jays scouts
Waterbury Giants players